This is a list of topics related to Belarus. Those interested in the subject can monitor changes to the pages by clicking on Related changes in the sidebar.

Belarus
 Belarus
 Belarusian diplomatic missions

Communications in Belarus
 Communications in Belarus
 .by
 Internet in Belarus
 Internet censorship in Belarus
 National State Teleradiocompany

Conservation in Belarus

National parks of Belarus
 Bialowieza Forest
 List of national parks of Belarus

World Heritage Sites in Belarus
 Bialowieza Forest
 Mir Castle Complex
 Niasviž Castle
 Struve Geodetic Arc
Template:World Heritage Sites in Belarus

Economy of Belarus
 Economy of Belarus
 Agriculture in Belarus
 Belarusian rubel
 Brest FEZ

Companies of Belarus
 List of Belarusian companies
 Belarusian Telegraph Agency
 Minsk Tractor Works

Automotive companies of Belarus
 Belshina

Motor vehicle manufacturers of Belarus
 BelAZ
 Minsk Automobile Plant

Trade unions of Belarus
 Belarus Free Trade Union
 Belarusian Congress of Democratic Trade Unions
 Federation of Trade Unions of Belarus

Education in Belarus

Belarusian schoolteachers
 Honored Teacher of the Republic of Belarus
 Natallia Tryfanava

Universities in Belarus
 Academy of Public Administration under the aegis of the President of the Republic of Belarus
 Belarus universities
 Belarusian State Technological University
 Belarusian State University
 Belarusian State University of Informatics and Radioelectronics
 Republican Institute for Vocational Education
 Grodno State Agrarian University

Fauna of Belarus
 Raccoon dog

Geography of Belarus
 Geography of Belarus
 Administrative divisions of Belarus
 Belarusian Ridge
 Brest FEZ
 Dnieper-Bug Canal
 Dzyarzhynskaya Hara
 Extreme points of Belarus
 Kresy
 Kurapaty
 List of Biosphere Reserves in Belarus
 List of cities in Belarus
 List of places in Belarus
 Pinsk Marshes
 Podlaskie
 Polesia
 Vetka Island
 Łojeŭ
 Śvisłač (disambiguation)

Amusement parks in Belarus
 Chelyuskinites Park
 Gorky Park (Minsk)

Craters of Belarus
 Logoisk crater

Lakes of Belarus
 Lake Chervonoye
 Lake Drūkšiai
 Lake Narač
 Lake Osveya

Rivers of Belarus

 Babrujka River
 Berezina River
 Daugava
 Dnieper River
 Drahabuž River
 Drut River
 Horyn River
 Iput River
 Jasielda River
 Kasplya River
 Kotra River
 Lovat River
 Mukhavets River
 Narač River
 Narew
 Neman River
 Neris
 Niamiha River
 Pałata
 Pripyat River
 Ptyč
 Sozh River
 Styr River
 Svislach (Berezina)
 Svislach (Neman)
 Ūla River
 Bug River

Subdivisions of Belarus
 Administrative divisions of Belarus

Provinces of Belarus
 Administrative divisions of Belarus
 ISO 3166-2:BY
 Brahin Raion
 Brest Voblast
 Buda-Kashalyowa Raion
 Homiel Voblast
 Hrodna Voblast
 Mahilyow Voblast
 Minsk
 Minsk Province (Belarus)
 Vitsebsk Voblast

Brest Province

 Kamenets Raion
 Kobryn Raion
 Pinsk Raion
 Stolin Raion
 Baranavichy Raion
 Biaroza rajon
 Brest Raion
 Brest Voblast
 Drahichyn Raion
 Hancavichy Raion
 Ivanava Raion
 Ivatsevichy Raion
 Luninets Raion
 Lyakhavichy Raion
 Malaryta Raion
 Pruzhany Raion
 Zhabinka Raion

Homieĺ Voblasć

 Homieĺ Voblasć
 Akciabrski Rajon
 Brahin Rajon
 Buda-Kašaliova Rajon
 Čačersk Rajon
 Chojniki Rajon
 Dobruš Rajon
 Dobruš
 Avrohom Elyashiv
 FC Slavija Mazyr
 Homieĺ Airport
 Homieĺ
 Homieĺ Rajon
 Jeĺsk Rajon
 Kalinkavičy
 Kalinkavičy Rajon
 Lieĺčycy Rajon
 Lojeu Rajon
 Mazyr
 Mazyr Rajon
 Naroulia Rajon
 Pietrykaŭ Rajon
 Rahačoŭ
 Rahačoŭ Rajon
 Rečyca Rajon
 Rečyca
 Svietlahorsk
 Svietlahorsk Rajon
 Vietka Rajon
 Žlobin
 Žlobin Rajon
 Žytkavičy Rajon

Towns in Belarus

 Antopol
 Asipovičy
 Ašmiany
 Astraviec
 Babinavičy
 Babruysk
 Baranovichi
 Barysaŭ
 Belaazyorsk
 Berazino
 Biaroza
 Biešankovičy
 Brasłaŭ
 Braslawl-Zawelski
 Brest, Belarus
 Buda-Kashalyowa
 Bychaw
 Čačersk
 Čašniki
 Červień
 Chavusy
 Davyd-Haradok
 Dobruš
 Drahičyn
 Dziatłava
 Dzyarzhynsk
 Hancavičy
 Haradok
 Hlybokaye
 Homyel
 Horki
 Hrodna
 Iŭje
 Ivacevičy
 Ivanava
 Jelsk
 Kalinkavichy
 Kamianiec
 Kareličy
 Khoiniki
 Kletsk
 Klimovichi
 Kobryn
 Kosava, Belarus
 Krichev
 Łahojsk
 Lakhva
 Lepiel
 Lida
 Liozna
 Łuniniec
 Lyahavichy
 Maladzyechna
 Mazyr
 Małaryta
 Meleshkovichi
 Miadzieł
 Mikachevitchy
 Minsk
 Mir, Belarus
 Mogilev
 Motal'
 Mstislavl
 Narowla
 Navahradak
 Navapolatsk
 Niasviž
 Orsha
 Pastavy
 Pinsk
 Polatsk
 Pruzhany
 Pyetrykaw
 Rahachow
 Rečyca
 Salihorsk
 Ščučyn
 Shkloŭ
 Slonim
 Slutsk
 Smarhon
 Śmiłavičy
 Stolin
 Stoŭptsy
 Svetlahorsk
 Svislach
 Tałačyn
 Tatarskaya Slabada
 Turaŭ
 Vassilyevichy
 Vaŭkavysk
 Vałožyn
 Vetka
 Vileyka
 Vitebsk
 Wysokie Litewskie
 Zasłaŭje
 Zhabinka
 Zhlobin
 Zhodzina
 Žytkavičy

Minsk

 Minsk
 BELOMO
 Belarus (tractor)
 Belarusfilm
 Belarusian State Technological University
 Belarusian State University
 Chelyuskinites Park
 Children's Railroad (Minsk)
 Dinamo Stadium (Minsk)
 FC Dinamo-93 Minsk
 Elektrit
 Dinamo Minsk
 MTZ-RIPO Minsk
 FC Traktor Minsk
 FC Zvezda-BGU Minsk
 Gorky Park (Minsk)
 History of Minsk
 Kurapaty
 MKAD (Minsk)
 Minsk (motorcycle)
 Minsk Blitz
 Minsk International Airport
 Minsk Province (Belarus)
 Minsk Terminal
 Minsk Tractor Works
 Minsk-1
 Mińsk Voivodeship
 Niamiha (disambiguation)
 Republican Institute for Vocational Education
 Traktor Stadium
 Water féerie

Villages in Belarus
 Maly Trostenets extermination camp
 Obech, Belarus
 Zdrawneva
 Zdzitava

Healthcare in Belarus
 Kozlovichi Mental Asylum

History of Belarus

 30th Waffen Grenadier Division of the SS (1st Belarusian)
 Battle of Bereza Kartuska (1919)
 Battle of the Niemen River
 Belarusian Central Rada
 Belarusian National Republic
 Belarusian resistance movement
 Berestia
 Bielski partisans
 Black Ruthenia
 Michael Boleslaw
 Boris stones
 Butaw
 Butigeidis
 Butvydas
 Byelorussian SSR
 Chernobyl disaster
 Chorny Kot
 Cities of the Grand Duchy of Lithuania
 Coat of arms of the Polish–Lithuanian Commonwealth
 Curzon Line
 Dausprungas
 Demetrius I Starshiy
 Druck
 Duchy of Polatsk
 Duchy of Zasłaŭje
 Eastern Vilnius region
 Erdywil
 Flag of Byelorussian SSR
 Gediminids
 Gediminas of Lithuania
 Giligin
 Gimbut
 Ginwill
 Golden age of Belarusian history
 Grand Duchy of Lithuania
 Grand Duchy of Ruthenia
 Hero-Fortress
 Hetman
 Hetmans of the Polish–Lithuanian Commonwealth
 Jaunutis
 Jeans Revolution
 Jewna
 Jogaila
 Khatyn massacre
 Kęstutis
 Kiernus
 Kievan Rus'
 Knyaz
 Koniuszy
 Koriat
 Kozlovichi Mental Asylum
 Kukowoyt
 Kurapaty
 Lakhva
 Valeri Legasov
 Lipka Tatars
 List of castles of Belarus
 List of early East Slavic states
 Lithuanian–Belorussian Soviet Socialist Republic
 Lubart
 Maly Trostenets extermination camp
 Manvydas
 Military history of Belarus during World War II
 Military settlement
 Mindaugas
 Mindowhowna
 Mingayl
 History of Minsk
 Mir yeshiva
 Mongol invasion of Rus
 Montwił
 Mikhail Nikolayevich Muravyov-Vilensky
 Narymont
 Narymunt
 Occupation of Belarus by Nazi Germany
 Algirdas
 Pale of Settlement
 Palemon
 Partitions of Poland
 Polish Autonomous District
 Polish–Lithuanian Commonwealth
 Polish–Lithuanian–Muscovite Commonwealth
 Polish–Lithuanian–Ruthenian Commonwealth
 Polish–Lithuanian–Teutonic War
 Polonization
 Pukuwer
 Republic of Central Lithuania
 Roman Danylovich
 Roman of Ruthenia
 Royal coronations in Poland
 Russification
 Ryngold
 Severians
 Sigismund Kęstutaitis
 Sigismund Korybut
 Skirgaila
 Skirmunt
 Slutsk Affair
 Sovietization
 Steksys
 Svarn
 Sviatoslav Olgovich
 Švitrigaila
 Territorial changes of the Baltic states
 Towtiwil
 Treaty of Hadiach
 Treniota
 Ivan Trubetskoy
 Nikita Trubetskoy
 Nikolay Troubetzkoy
 Piotr Nikolaievich Troubetzkoy
 Yuri Troubetzkoy
 Traidenis
 Trubetsk
 Fiodor Trubetsky
 Iwan Trubetsky
 Nikita Kosoj Trubetsky
 Roman Trubetsky
 Symeon Trubetsky
 Symeon Perski Trubetsky
 Aleksey Trubetskoy
 Yuriy Trubetskoy
 Michał Trubetsky
 Fiodor Trubecki
 Pawel Troubetzkoy
 Wigund-Jeronym Trubecki
 Vladimir Waloc Trubetsky
 Union of Brest
 Union of Krewo
 Union of Lublin
 Uyezd
 Vaidotas
 Vaišvilkas
 Vajacki marš
 Voivodeship
 Volost
 Vseslav of Polotsk
 Vytenis
 Water féerie
 West Belarus
 White Russia
 White Ruthenia
 Yaropolk II of Kiev
 Yuriy of Ruthenia

Archaeological sites in Belarus
 Brest, Belarus
 Milograd culture

Battles of the Grand Duchy of Lithuania
 Battle of Aizkraukle
 Battle of Ţuţora (1620)
 Siege of Christmemel
 Battle of Durbe
 Battle on the Irpen' River
 Battle of Kircholm
 Battle of Orsha
 Battle of Wiłkomierz
 Battle of Połonka
 Battle of Skuodas
 Battle of Stångebro
 Battle of the Sun
 Battle of Vedrosha
 Battle of the Vorskla River

Battles of the Polish–Lithuanian–Teutonic War
 Battle of Grunwald
 Battle of Koronowo
 Siege of Marienburg (1410)

Battles of the Polish–Muscovite War (1605–1618)
 Battle of Dobrynichi
 Battle of Klushino
 Siege of Smolensk (1609–1611)
 Siege of Troitse-Sergiyeva Lavra

Chernobyl disaster
 Yury Bandazhevsky
 Bellesrad
 Chernobyl
 Chernobyl Heart
 Chernobyl Nuclear Power Plant
 Chernobyl Shelter Fund
 Chernobyl disaster
 Chernobyl disaster effects
 Chernobyl in the popular consciousness
 Chernobyl2020
 Commission de recherche et d'information indépendantes sur la radioactivité
 Elena Filatova
 Igor Kostin
 Klimovichi
 Valeri Legasov
 Liquidator (Chernobyl)
 New Safe Confinement
 Pripyat River
 Prypiat, Ukraine
 Adi Roche
 Slavutych
 Threat of the Dnieper reservoirs
 Zone of alienation

East Slavic history
 East Slavs
 Gostomysl
 Novgorod Republic
 Polonization
 Pskov Republic
 Truvor and Sineus
 Vadim the Bold

East Slavic manuscripts
 Bychowiec Chronicle
 Full Collection of Russian Chronicles
 Gertrude Psalter
 Halych-Volhynian Chronicle
 Hypatian Codex
 Ioachim Chronicle
 Izmaragd
 A Journey Beyond the Three Seas
 Kazan Chronicle
 Kiev Psalter of 1397
 Laurentian Codex
 Legal Code of Pskov
 Nominalia of the Bulgarian khans
 Novgorod Codex
 Novgorod First Chronicle
 Ostromir Gospel
 Peresopnytsia Gospels
 Primary Chronicle
 Radziwiłł Chronicle
 Russkaya Pravda
 Sudebnik
 The Tale of Igor's Campaign
 Zadonshchina

Kievan Rus

 Kievan Rus'
 Anna from Byzantium
 Architecture of Kievan Rus
 Baptism of Kievan Rus'
 Belozero Duchy
 Biritch
 Boris and Gleb
 Boris stones
 Church of the Tithes
 Coloman of Lodomeria
 Culture of ancient Rus
 Cumans
 Daniel of Halych
 De Administrando Imperio
 Dobrynya
 Drevlyans
 Druzhina
 Duchy of Polatsk
 East Slavs
 Etymology of Rus and derivatives
 Euphrosyne of Polatsk
 Full Collection of Russian Chronicles
 Garðaríki
 George I of Halych
 Georgius Tzul
 Gytha of Wessex
 Igor Svyatoslavich
 Ingegerd Olofsdotter
 Kiev Expedition
 Kievian Letter
 Konstantin Dobrynich
Kurya (khan)
 Leo I of Halych
 List of early East Slavic states
 Malusha
 Metiga
 Mstislav the Bold
 Muscovite Manorialism
 Novgorod Codex
 Old East Slavic language
 Ostromir
 Ostromir Gospel
 Pechenegs
 Perun
 Posadnik
 Primary Chronicle
 Putyata
 Rogneda of Polotsk
 Rostislav of Slavonia
 Rulers of Kievan Rus'
 Rus' (people)
 Russkaya Pravda
 Ruthenia
 Severia
 Smerd
 Sveneld
 The Tale of Igor's Campaign
 Temple ring
 Tmutarakan
 Ukrainian hryvnia
 Varangians
 Veche
 Velikiy Novgorod
 Vladimir of Novgorod
 Vladimir-Suzdal
 Volhynians
 Votchina
 Vsevolod III, Grand Prince of Vladimir
 Vshchizh
 Vyachko
 Vyatichs
 Vyshata
 Vyshhorod
 Yan Vyshatich
 Zalesye

Battles of Kievan Rus
 Battle of Dorostolon
 Battle on the Irpen' River
 Battle of the Kalka River
 Siege of Ryazan
 Battle of the Sit River
 Battle of the Stugna River
 Battle of Zawichost

Rulers of Kievan Rus

 Askold and Dir
 Daniel of Halych
 Yuri Dolgoruki
 Family life and children of Vladimir I
 Gleb of Kiev
 Igor II of Kiev
 Igor, Grand Prince of Kiev
 Ingvar of Kiev
 Iziaslav I of Kiev
 Iziaslav II of Kiev
 Iziaslav III of Kiev
 Iziaslav IV Vladimirovich
 Michael of Chernigov
 Mikhail of Vladimir
 Mstislav I of Kiev
 Mstislav II of Kiev
 Mstislav III of Kiev
 Mstislav of Chernigov
 Oleg I of Chernigov
 Oleg of Novgorod
 Olga of Kiev
 Roman the Great
 Rostislav II of Kiev
 Rurik
 Rurik Rostislavich
 Sviatopolk I of Kiev
 Sviatopolk II of Kiev
 Sviatoslav I of Kiev
 Sviatoslav II of Kiev
 Sviatoslav III of Kiev
 Vladimir I of Kiev
 Vladimir II Monomakh
 Vladimir II Mstislavich
 Vladimir III Rurikovich
 Vseslav of Polotsk
 Vsevolod I of Kiev
 Vsevolod II of Kiev
 Vsevolod IV of Kiev
 Yaropolk I of Kiev
 Yaropolk II of Kiev
 Yaroslav I the Wise
 Yaroslav II of Kiev

East Slavic history stubs

 Anti-Slavism
 Battle of Dorostolon
 Battle on the Irpen' River
 Bychowiec Chronicle
 Garðaríki
 Gertrude of Poland
 Halych-Volhynian Chronicle
 Hilarion of Kiev
 Hypatian Codex
 Ioachim Chronicle
 Iziaslav II of Kiev
 Iziaslav III of Kiev
 Iziaslav IV Vladimirovich
 Kijów Voivodeship
 Knyaz Konstantin Konstantinovich Ostrozhskiy
 Koleda
 Konstantin of Murom
 Konyushy
 List of early East Slavic states
 Liubech
 Liškiava
 Mstislav II of Kiev
 Namestnik
 Ostroh
 Pereyaslavets
 Polish–Lithuanian–Ruthenian Commonwealth
 Portal:Russia/Russia-related Wikipedia notice board/Archive0
 Posad
 Ros' River
 Rostislav I of Kiev
 Saint Anthony of Kiev
 Sloboda
 Stanislav of Kiev
 Sviatoslav III of Kiev
 Sviatoslav Olgovich
 Template:East-Slavic-hist-stub
 Temple ring
 Theodosius of Kiev
 Tivertsi
 Union of Brest
 Uyezd
 Viacheslav I of Kiev
 Vladimir II Mstislavich
 Volost
 Votchina
 Yaropolk II of Kiev
 Yaroslav II of Kiev
 Šajkaši

Elections in Belarus
 Elections in Belarus
 1995 Belarus Referendum
 1996 Belarus Referendum
 2004 Belarus Referendum
 2006 Belarusian presidential election

Maps of the history of Belarus
 Maps of Belarus

Maps of Kievan Rus

Maps of the Soviet Union

Maps of the Polish–Lithuanian Commonwealth

Military history of Belarus during World War II
 Military history of Belarus during World War II
 Occupation of Belarus by Nazi Germany

Polish–Lithuanian Union
 Polish–Lithuanian Union
 Constitution of May 3, 1791
 Union of Grodno
 Union of Horodło
 Union of Krewo
 Union of Lublin
 Union of Mielnik
 Pact of Vilnius and Radom

Belarusian rulers
 Butigeidis
 Butvydas
 Daumantas of Lithuania
 Ginwill
 Gediminas of Lithuania
 Jaunutis
 Kukowoyt
 Mindaugas
 Mingayl
 Narymunt
 Pukuwer
 Rogneda of Polotsk
 Skirgaila
 Traidenis
 Treniota
 Vaišvilkas
 Vseslav of Polotsk
 Vytautas the Great
 Vytenis

Ruthenia
 Ruthenia
 Belarusian heraldry
 Grand Duchy of Ruthenia
 Okopy, Ternopil Oblast
 Pukuwer
 White Ruthenia

Ruthenian nobility
 Pukuwer
 Nick Rock'n'Roll

Uprisings of Belarus
 January Uprising
 Kościuszko Uprising
 November Uprising

Years in Belarus

2006 in Belarus
 2006 Belarusian presidential election
 Belarus at the 2006 Winter Olympics
 Belarus at the 2006 Winter Paralympics

Belarusian history stubs
 Battle of Wiłkomierz
 Battle of Połonka
 Battle of Vedrosha
 Belarusian Marseillaise
 Bychowiec Chronicle
 History of the Jews in Belarus
 List of early East Slavic states
 Lithuanian–Belorussian Soviet Socialist Republic
 Milograd culture
 Polish Autonomous District
 Polish–Lithuanian union
 Polish–Lithuanian–Ruthenian Commonwealth
 Template:Belarus-hist-stub
 Union of Grodno
 West Belarus
 Western Krai

Images of Belarus
 Template:PD-BY-exempt

Belarusian law
 Article 181 (Criminal Code of Belarus)
 Capital punishment in Belarus
 Constitution of Belarus
 Constitutional Court of Belarus
 Gay rights in Belarus
 Human rights in Belarus
 Censorship in Belarus
 Supreme Court of Belarus

Law enforcement in Belarus
 State Security Agency of the Republic of Belarus (KDB in Belarusian, KGB in Russian)
 Militsiya
 Ministry of Internal Affairs of Belarus
 Presidential Guard (Belarus)

Maps of Belarus
 Maps of Belarus

Old maps of Belarus
 Maps of Belarus

Belarusian media
 Media in Belarus
 Belarusian Association of Journalists
 Internet in Belarus
 .by
 Censorship in Belarus

Belarusian journalists
 Veronika Cherkasova
 Siarhiej Dubaviec
 Andrej Dyńko
 Ihar Hermianchuk
 Piotra Sych
 Dmitry Zavadsky

Newspapers published in Belarus
 Belorusy i rynok
 Biełarus
 Homan
 Homan (1884)
 Narodnaja Volya (newspaper)
 Naša Niva
 Zviazda

See also List of newspapers in Belarus

Radio stations in Belarus
 List of radio stations in Belarus
 Belarusian Radio
 European Radio for Belarus
 Radio Stil (Belarus)

Military of Belarus
 Armed Forces of Belarus
 Brest Fortress

Organizations based in Belarus
 Belarusian Helsinki Committee
 Committee for Standardization, Metrology and Certification of Belarus
 Union of Poles in Belarus
 World Association of Belarusians

Youth organizations based in Belarus
 Belarusian Republican Youth Union
 Belarusian Scout Association
 National Scout Association of Belarus
 Scouting in Belarus
 The Association of Belarusian Guides

Scouting in Belarus
 Scouting in Belarus
 Belarusian Scout Association
 National Scout Association of Belarus
 The Association of Belarusian Guides

Belarusian people

 Fabijan Abrantovich
 Stanisław Bułak-Bałachowicz
 Katsia Damankova
 Mikhail Doroshevich
 Dregovichs
 Drevlyans
 Valery Fabrikant
 Andrei Gromyko
 Uładzimir Karvat
 Michaił Karčmit
 Vital Kramko
 Litvins
 Pyotr Masherov
 Vladimir Motyl
 Pyotr Mstislavets
 Polochans
 Nikolai Przhevalsky
 Andrey Romashevsky
 Anthony Sawoniuk
 Francysk Skaryna
 Svyatopolk-Mirsky
 Symon Budny
 Immanuel Velikovsky
 Michał Vituška
 Rostislav Yankovsky
 Vladimir Yarets

Belarusian people by occupation

Belarusian singers
 Angelica Agurbash
 Viktor Kalina
 Natalia Podolskaya
 Rusya 
 Seryoga
 Polina Smolova

Belarusian bishops
 Kazimierz Świątek

Belarusian cosmonauts
 Pyotr Klimuk
 Vladimir Kovalyonok

Belarusian mathematicians
 Semyon Aranovich Gershgorin

Belarusian sculptors
 Antoine Pevsner
 Ossip Zadkine

Belarus born people
 S. Ansky
 Menachem Begin
 Ignacy Domeyko
 Felix Edmundovich Dzerzhinsky
 Joseph Günzburg
 Simon Halkin
 Ignacy Hryniewiecki
 Bronislaw Kaminski
 Tadeusz Kościuszko
 Eliza Orzeszkowa
 Valeriy Serdyukov

Belarusian Jews

 Zhores Ivanovich Alferov
 Bernhard Baron
 Menachem Begin
 Isaac Dov Berkowitz
 Chaim Berlin
 Naftali Zvi Yehuda Berlin
 Brisk yeshivas and methods
 Marc Chagall
Pinkhos Churgin 
 Morris Raphael Cohen
 David Dubinsky
 Simon Dubnow
 Avrohom Elyashiv
 Yakov Gamarnik
 Boris Gelfand
 Chaim Ozer Grodzinski
 Abraham Harkavy
 Hesya Helfman
 History of the Jews in Belarus
 Dawid Janowski
 Yaakov Yisrael Kanievsky
 Avraham Yeshayahu Karelitz
 Berl Katznelson
 Jakob Klatzkin
 Lakhva
 Mir yeshiva
 Shmuel Plavnik
 Lev Polugaevsky
 Mendele Mocher Sforim
 Yitzhak Shamir
 Refael Shapiro
 Shimon Shkop
 Chaim Shmuelevitz
 Chaim Soloveitchik
 Joseph Soloveitchik
 Moshe Soloveichik
 Yitzchak Zev Soloveitchik
 Chaïm Soutine
 Chaim Volozhin
 Lev Vygotsky
 Elchonon Wasserman
 Chaim Weizmann
 Ossip Zadkine

People of Belarusian descent

Belarusian Americans
 Bernhard Baron
 Morris Raphael Cohen
 Kirk Douglas
 Michael Douglas
 David Dubinsky
 Leon Kobrin
 Louis B. Mayer
 Natalia Mishkutenok
 David Sarnoff
 Simeon Strunsky
 Mikałaj Sudziłoŭski
 Jan Zaprudnik
 Oscar Zariski

Belarusian Australians
 Dmitri Markov
 Sidney Myer

Belarusian Russians
 Zhores Ivanovich Alferov
 Sergei Gorlukovich
 Andrei Makarevich
 Valeria Novodvorskaya
 Dmitri Shostakovich
 Georgy Shpak

Belarusian Ukrainians
 Artem Milevskyi
 Viktor Yanukovych

Belarusian Canadians

 Valery Fabrikant
 Albert Gretzky
 Walter Gretzky
 Wayne Gretzky
 Ivonka Survilla

Belarusian Polish people
 Włodzimierz Cimoszewicz
 Eugeniusz Czykwin

Belarusian Uruguayans
 Carlos Sherman

Belarusian nobility

 Szlachta
 Butigeidis
 Butvydas
 Jan Karol Chodkiewicz
 Dymitr Korybut
 Felix Edmundovich Dzerzhinsky
 Erdywil
 Gediminas of Lithuania
 Gimbut
 Ginwill
 Jaunutis
 Jewna
 Kiernus
 Knyaz
 Tadeusz Kościuszko
 Kukowoyt
 Lubart
 Manvydas
 Mindaugas
 Mingayl
 Montwił
 Narymunt
 Julian Ursyn Niemcewicz
 Algirdas
 Konstanty Ostrogski
 Palemon
 Palemonids
 Pukuwer
 Franciszka Urszula Radziwiłłowa
 Michał Kazimierz "Rybeńko" Radziwiłł
 Radziwiłł
 Princess Eugénie of Greece and Denmark
 Sanguszko
 Sapieha
 Lew Sapieha
 Kazimierz Siemienowicz
 Skirgaila
 Traidenis
 Treniota
 Fiodor Trubecki
 Wigund-Jeronym Trubecki
 Vaišvilkas
 Vytenis

Chodkiewicz
 Anna Eufrozyna Chodkiewicz
 Jan Karol Chodkiewicz
 Jan Kazimierz Chodkiewicz
 Krzysztof Chodkiewicz
 Teresa Chodkiewicz

Kuncewicz
 Kuncewicz

Ostrogski
 Ostrogski
 Aleksander Ostrogski
 Anna Alojza Ostrogska
 Coat of arms of Ostrogski
 Janusz Ostrogski
 Katarzyna Ostrogska (1560–1579)
 Katarzyna Ostrogska (1602–1642)
 Konstanty Ostrogski
 Konstanty Wasyl Ostrogski
 Zofia Ostrogska

Radzivil

 Radzivil
 Albrycht Stanislav Radzivil
 Albrycht Vladyslav Radzivil
 Aleksander Ludwig Radzivil
 Anna Christina Radzivil
 Anna Radzivil
 Anna Radzivil (1476–1522)
 Anthony Radzivil
 Antoni Radzivil
 Barbara Radzivil
 Boguslav Radzivil
 Carole Radzivil
 Cecylia Maria Radzivil
 Dominik Hieronim Radzivil
 Dominik Nikolaj Radzivil
 Princess Eugénie of Greece and Denmark
 Gregori IV Radzivil
 Hieronim Florian Radzivil
 Hieronim Wincenty Radziwiłł
 Janush Radzivil (1579–1620)
 Janush Radzivil (1612–1655)
 Jezhy Radzivil
 Jezhy Radzivil (1556–1600)
 Joanna Katerina Radzivil
 Józef Nikolaj Radzivil
 Kniaz' Stanislav "Kniaginia Kochanku" Radzivil
 Kniaz' Stanislav Radzivil (1669–1719)
 Karolina Teresa Radzivil
 Katerina Barbara Radzivil
 Katerina Karolina Radzivil
 Kristina Radzivil
 Kristof Nikolaj "the Lightning" Radzivil
 Kristof Nikolaj Radzivil
 Kristof Radzivil
 Lee Radzivil
 Matvej Radzivil
 Michail Gedeon Radzivill
 Michail Hieronim Radzivil
 Michail Kazimir "Rybeńko" Radzivil
 Michail Kazimir Radzivil
 Nikolaj "the Black" Radzivil
 Nikolaj "the Red" Radzivil
 Nikolaj Kristof "the Orphan" Radzivil
 Nikolaj Kristof Radzivil
 Nikolaj VII Radzivil
 Mir Castle Complex
 Niasvizh Castle
 Franciska Ursula Radzivilova
 Radzivill Chronicle
 Stanislav Albrecht Radzivil
 Tekla Róza Radzivil
 Zigmund Karol Radzivil

Trubetskoy

 Trubetskoy
 Aleksey Trubetskoy
 Ivan Betskoy
 Coat of arms of Druck
 Coat of arms of Pogoń Litewska
 Coat of arms of Trubetsky
 Demetrius I Starszij
 Dmitry Troubetskoy
 Fiodor Trubetsky
 Grigory Troubetzkoy
 Igor Troubetzkoy
 Ivan Trubetskoy
 Iwan Trubetsky
 Michał Trubetsky
 Nestor Troubetzkoy
 Nikita Trubetskoy
 Nikita Kosoj Trubetsky
 Nikolai Trubetzkoy
 Nikolay Troubetzkoy
 Paolo Troubetzkoy
 Pawel Troubetzkoy
 Peter Troubetzkoy
 Pierre Troubetzkoy
 Piotr Nikolaievich Troubetzkoy
 Piotr Trubecki
 Roman Trubetsky
 Sergei Petrovich Troubetzkoy
 Symeon Perski Trubetsky
 Symeon Trubetsky
 Fiodor Trubecki
 Wigund-Jeronym Trubecki
 Tõnu Trubetsky
 Vladimir Petrovich Trubetskoy
 Vladimir Waloc Trubetsky
 Yuri Troubetzkoy
 Yuriy Trubetskoy

Belarusian saints
 Cyril of Turaw
 Euphrosyne of Polatsk
 Jozafat Kuncewicz

Belarusian people stubs

 Alaksandar Dubko
 Alaksandar Kazulin
 Aldona Ona of Lithuania
 Alyaksandr Sulima
 Alexander Medved
 Andrei Dapkiunas
 Andrei Mikhnevich
 Andrei Rybakou
 Anthony Sawoniuk
 Anton Prylepau
 Artem Kontsevoy (footballer, born 1983)
 Artem Kontsevoy (footballer, born 1999)
 Bernhard Baron
 Boris Gelfand
 Butaw
 Butvydas
 Coloman of Lodomeria
 Demetrius I Starshiy
 Dmitri Dashinski
 Dmitry Debelka
 Dmitry Zavadsky
 Eduard Malofeev
 Elena Korosteleva
 Ellina Zvereva
 Erdywil
 Franciszka Urszula Radziwiłłowa
 Frants Kostyukevich
 Gennadiy Moroz
 Gennady Grushevoy
 George I of Halych
 Hanna Batsiushka
 Ihar Hermianchuk
 Inna Zhukova
 Irina Yatchenko
 Ivonka Survilla
 Jaunutis
 Jewna
 Katsia Damankova
 Koriat
 Larissa Loukianenko
 Lubart
 Magomed Aripgadjiev
 Manvydas
 Maxim Tank
 Michael Boleslaw
 Michaił Karčmit
 Mihas' Klimovich
 Mikalay Husowski
 Mikhail Grabovski
 Mikhail Marynich
 Mingayl
 Myechyslaw Ivanavich Hryb
 Nadzeya Astapchuk
 Narymont
 Narymunt
 Natallia Mikhnevich
 Natallia Sazanovich
 Natallia Solohub
 Natallia Tryfanava
 Natalya Baranovskaya
 Natalya Shikolenko
 Niescier Sakałoŭski
 Olga Kardopoltseva
 Pavel Kastusik
 Pavieł Maryjaŭ
 Polina Smolova
 Pyotr Mstislavets
 Roman Danylovich
 Rostislav II of Kiev
 Rostislav Yankovsky
 Ruslan Alekhno
 Ryhor Reles
 Ryta Turava
 Sergei Aleinikov
 Sergei Gaidukevich
 Sergei Liakhovich
 Sergey Sidorsky
 Shlomo Heiman
 Sigismund Kestutaitis
 Sigismund Korybut
 Skirmunt
 Svarn
 Symon Budny
 Tatsiana Stukalava
 Template:Belarus-bio-stub
 Towtiwil
 Uladzimir Karyzny
 Uladzimir Navumau
 Uładzimir Hančaryk
 Uładzimir Karvat
 Vadim Devyatovskiy
 Vaidotas
 Vaišvilkas
 Valentin Belkevich
 Valentina Tsybulskaya
 Viktor Reneysky
 Vintsent Dunin-Martsinkyevich
 Vital Kramko
 Vladimir Goncharik
 Vladimir Vasilkovich
 Vladimir Veremeenko
 Vladimir Voltchkov
 Vyacheslav Hleb
 Vyacheslav Yanovskiy
 Vytenis
 Yakub Kolas
 Yanka Kupala
 Yechezkel Levenstein
 Yevgeniy Misyulya
 Yulia Raskina
 Yuriy of Ruthenia

Politics of Belarus

 Politics of Belarus
 A Day of Solidarity with Belarus
 Belarusian Helsinki Committee
 Freedom Day (Belarus)
 Human rights in Belarus
 Censorship in Belarus
 Jeans Revolution
 Ministry of Internal Affairs of Belarus
 Water féerie
 Zubr (political organization)

Foreign relations of Belarus
 Foreign relations of Belarus
 Belarusian-American relations
 Belarusian-European Union relations
 Belarus Democracy Act of 2004
 Eastern Vilnius region
 George A. Krol
 List of Ambassadors from the United Kingdom to Belarus
 List of ambassadors of the United States to Belarus
 Territorial changes of the Baltic States
 Union of Russia and Belarus

Belarusian diplomats
 Andrei Dapkiunas
 Mikhail Khvostov

Political parties in Belarus
 List of political parties in Belarus
 Agrarian Party of Belarus
 Beer Lovers Party (Belarus)
 Belarusian Labour Party
 Belarusian People's Front
 Belarusian Social Democratic Party (Assembly)
 Belarusian Social Democratic Party (People's Assembly)
 Belarusian Socialist Sporting Party
 Belarusian Women's Party "Nadzieja"
 Communist Party of Belarus
 Conservative Christian Party
 Democratic Centrist Coalition
 European Coalition Free Belarus
 Liberal Democratic Party of Belarus
 Party of Communists of Belarus
 People's Coalition 5 Plus
 Republic (Belarus)
 Republican Party of Labor and Justice
 Social Democratic Party of Popular Accord
 United Civil Party of Belarus
 United Democratic Forces of Belarus
 Young Belarus

Belarusian politicians
 Radasłaŭ Astroŭski
 Alaksandar Dubko
 Yakov Gamarnik
 Ihar Hermianchuk
 Myechyslaw Ivanavich Hryb
 Alaksandar Kazulin
 Anatoly Lebedko
 List of Belarusian Prime Ministers
 Alexander Lukashenko
 Pavieł Maryjaŭ
 Mikhail Marynich
 Pyotr Masherov
 Alaksandar Milinkievič
 Uladzimir Naumau
 Zianon Pazniak
 Lew Sapieha
 Stanislav Shushkevich
 Mikałaj Sudziłoŭski
 Ivonka Survilla
 Vincuk Viačorka
 Vladimir Goncharik
 Jury Zacharanka

Belarusian revolutionaries
 Gesya Gelfman
 Ignacy Hryniewiecki
 Konstanty Kalinowski

Presidents of Belarus
 Alexander Lukashenko

Prime Ministers of Belarus
 Sergey Sidorsky

Belarusian politics stubs
 2004 Belarus Referendum
 All Belarusian People's Assembly
 Belarusian Helsinki Committee
 Belarusian Labour Party
 Belarusian Social Democratic Party (Assembly)
 Belarusian Social Democratic Party (People's Assembly)
 Charter 97
 Conservative Christian Party
 European Coalition Free Belarus
 The Free Belarus Initiative
 Freedom Day (Belarus)
 Party of Communists of Belarus
 People's Coalition 5 Plus
 Republic (Belarus)
 Republican Party of Labor and Justice
 Social Democratic Party of Popular Accord
 Template:Belarus-politics-stub
 United Civil Party of Belarus
 United Democratic Forces of Belarus
 Water féerie
 Zubr (political organization)

Religion in Belarus
 Belarusian Autocephalous Orthodox Church
 Belarusian Greek Catholic Church
 Hinduism in Belarus
 Roman Catholicism in Belarus

Cemeteries in Belarus
 Kalvaryja

Science and technology in Belarus
 BelKA
 Belarus (tractor)
 Bellesrad
 ES EVM
 ES PEVM
 Minsk (motorcycle)
 Minsk family of computers
 National Academy of Sciences of Belarus

Belarusian scientists
 Yury Bandazhevsky
 Fiodar Fiodaraŭ
 Gennady Grushevoy
 Yefim Karskiy
 Zianon Pazniak
 Vladimir Platonov
 Stanislav Shushkevich
 Kazimierz Siemienowicz
 Mikałaj Sudziłoŭski
 Lev Vygotsky
 Oscar Zariski

Belarusian historians
 Mikałaj Ułaščyk
 Jan Zaprudnik

Belarusian society
 Chernobyl Children's Project International
 Demographics of Belarus
 Freedom Day (Belarus)
 Gay rights in Belarus
 Human rights in Belarus
 Censorship in Belarus
 Miss Belarus
 Poleszuk
 Public holidays in Belarus

Awards and decorations of Belarus
 Awards and decorations of Belarus
 Hero of Belarus

Sport in Belarus
 Belarus national bandy team
 Belarus at the 2006 Winter Paralympics
 Belarus at the Olympics
 Belarusian national men's ice hockey team

Athletics in Belarus

Belarus at the European Championships in Athletics
 Belarus at the 2006 European Championships in Athletics

Sports festivals hosted in Belarus
 1998 European Amateur Boxing Championships

Football in Belarus
 Belarus national football team
 Belarus women's national football team
 Football Federation of Belarus

Belarusian football competitions
 Belarusian Cup
 Belarusian Premier League
 Belarusian First League

Belarusian football managers
 Eduard Malofeev
 Yuri Puntus

Belarusian footballers
 Sergei Aleinikov
 Valentin Belkevich
 Sergei Gorlukovich
 Sasha Gotsmanov
 Sergei Gurenko
 Alexander Hleb
 Vyacheslav Hleb
 Timofei Kalachev
 Vasily Khomutovsky
 Artem Kontsevoy
 Vitali Kutuzov
 Eduard Malofeev
 Yuri Puntus
 Maxim Romaschenko
 Alyaksandr Sulima

Belarusian football clubs
 List of football clubs in Belarus
 BATE Borisov
 FC Dinamo Minsk
 FC Dnepr Mogilev
 FC Belshina Bobruisk
 FC Darida Minsk Raion
 FC Dinamo Brest
 FC SKVICH Minsk
 FC Vitebsk
 FC Naftan Novopolotsk
 FC Slavia Mozyr
 FC Torpedo Zhodino
 FC Transmash Mogilev
 FC Gomel
 FC Partizan Minsk
 FC Molodechno
 FC Neman Grodno
 FC Shakhtyor Soligorsk
 FC Zvezda-BGU Minsk

Defunct Belarusian football clubs
 FC Dinamo-93 Minsk
 FC Traktor Minsk

FC MTZ-RIPO
 FC Partizan Minsk
 Vladimir Romanov
 Traktor Stadium

FC MTZ-RIPO managers
 Alexandr Piskarev
 Yuri Puntus

Football venues in Belarus
 Atlant Stadium
 Central Stadium (Gomel)
 Dinamo-Yuni Stadium, Minsk, also named Darida Stadium
 Dinamo Stadium (Minsk)
 Football Manege (Minsk)
 Haradski Stadium, Barysaw
 Haradzki Stadium (Maladzechna)
 Luch Stadium
 Neman Stadium
 Dinamo Stadium (Brest)
 Spartak Stadium (Mogilev)
 Spartak Stadium (Babruysk)
 Stroitel Stadium, Soligorsk
 Tarpeda Stadium, Minsk
 Torpedo Stadium (Mahilyow)
 Torpedo Stadium (Zhodino)
 Traktor Stadium
 Transmash Stadium
 Vitebsky Central Sport Complex
 Yunost Stadium (Mozyr)
 Yunost Stadium (Smorgon)

Footballers in Belarus by club

FC MTZ-RIPO players
 Vyacheslav Hleb
 Artem Kontsevoy
 Hamlet Mkhitaryan
 Alyaksandr Sulima

Handball in Belarus

Belarusian handball clubs
 SKA Minsk

Ice hockey in Belarus
 Belarus Ice Hockey Federation
 Belarusian Hockey League

Belarusian ice hockey players
 Alexey Dmitriev
 Mikhail Grabovski
 Konstantin Koltsov
 Andrei Kostitsyn
 Sergei Kostitsyn
 Ruslan Salei

Belarus at the Olympics
 Belarus at the Olympics
 Belarus Olympic Committee
 Belarus at the 1994 Winter Olympics
 Belarus at the 1996 Summer Olympics
 Belarus at the 1998 Winter Olympics
 Belarus at the 2000 Summer Olympics
 Belarus at the 2004 Summer Olympics
 Belarus at the 2006 Winter Olympics

Olympic competitors for Belarus

 Magomed Aripgadjiev
 Nadzeya Astapchuk
 Igor Astapkovich
 Hanna Batsiushka
 Dmitry Debelka
 Lyudmila Gubkina
 Eduard Hämäläinen
 Dzimitry Hancharuk
 Konstantin Koltsov
 Yanina Karolchyk-Pravalinskaya
 Sergei Liakhovich
 Sergey Lishtvan
 Larissa Loukianenko
 Kanstantsin Lukashyk
 Vadzim Makhneu
 Sergei Martynov (sport shooter)
 Andrei Mikhnevich
 Natallia Mikhnevich
 Max Mirnyi
 Raman Piatrushenka
 Alena Popchanka
 Natallia Sazanovich
 Maryia Smaliachkova
 Sviatlana Sudak
 Ivan Tikhon
 Volha Tsander
 Valeriy Tsilent
 Ryta Turava
 Ilona Usovich
 Vladimir Voltchkov
 Irina Yatchenko
 Igor Zhelezovski
 Aliaksandr Zhukouski
 Viktar Zuyev

Olympic tennis players of Belarus
 Victoria Azarenka
 Max Mirnyi
 Natasha Zvereva

Olympic weightlifters of Belarus
 Leonid Taranenko

Belarusian sportspeople

Belarusian sportspeople in doping cases
 Vadim Devyatovskiy
 Ellina Zvereva

Belarusian archers
 Hanna Karasiova
 Anton Prylepau

Belarusian athletes

 Nadzeya Astapchuk
 Igor Astapkovich
 Svetlana Buraga
 Vadim Devyatovskiy
 Oksana Dragun
 Vladimir Dubrovshchik
 Natalya Dukhnova
 Lyudmila Gubkina
 Eduard Hämäläinen
 Dzimitry Hancharuk
 Vasiliy Kaptyukh
 Olga Kardopoltseva
 Yanina Karolchyk-Pravalinskaya
 Frants Kostyukevich
 Anna Kozak
 Dmitri Markov
 Andrei Mikhnevich
 Natallia Mikhnevich
 Yevgeniy Misyulya
 Gennadiy Moroz
 Yulia Nesterenko
 Alena Nevmerzhitskaya
 Aleksandr Potashov
 Natalya Safronnikova
 Natallia Sazanovich
 Natalya Shikolenko
 Tatyana Shikolenko
 Maryia Smaliachkova
 Natallia Solohub
 Sviatlana Sudak
 Ivan Tikhon
 Volha Tsander
 Valentina Tsybulskaya
 Alesia Turava
 Ryta Turava
 Ilona Usovich
 Irina Yatchenko
 Ellina Zvereva

Belarusian basketball players
 Ivan Edeshko
 Vladimir Veremeenko

Belarusian boxers
 Magomed Aripgadjiev
 Yuri Foreman
 Sergei Liakhovich

Belarusian canoers
 Aliaksei Abalmasau
 Aliaksandr Kurliandchyk
 Vadzim Makhneu
 Uladzimir Parfianovich
 Raman Piatrushenka
 Dzmitry Rabchanka
 Viktor Reneysky
 Dziamyan Turchyn
 Dzmitry Vaitsishkin
 Aliaksandr Zhukouski

Belarusian chess players
 Boris Gelfand
 Dawid Janowski
 Ratmir Kholmov
 Lev Polugaevsky

Belarusian figure skaters
 Tatiana Navka
 Julia Soldatova

Belarusian freestyle skiers
 Dmitri Dashinski

Belarusian gymnasts
 Svetlana Boginskaya
 Olga Korbut
 Marina Lobatch
 Larissa Loukianenko
 Yulia Raskina
 Vitaly Scherbo
 Inna Zhukova

Belarusian handball players
 Siarhei Rutenka

Belarusian martial artists
 Andrei Arlovski

Belarusian judoka
 Anatoly Laryukov

Belarusian kickboxers
 Alexey Ignashov

Belarusian mixed martial artists
 Andrei Arlovski
 Vladimir Matyushenko

Belarusian rowers
 Ekaterina Karsten

Belarusian sport shooters
 Kanstantsin Lukashyk
 Sergei Martynov (sport shooter)

Belarusian speed skaters
 Igor Zhelezovski

Belarusian sport wrestlers
 Dmitry Debelka
 Sergey Lishtvan
 Alexander Medved
 Aleksandr Pavlov
 Valeriy Tsilent

Belarusian swimmers
 Natalya Baranovskaya
 Alena Popchanka

Belarusian tennis players
 Victoria Azarenka
 Max Mirnyi
 Vladimir Voltchkov
 Anastasiya Yakimova
 Natasha Zvereva

Belarusian volleyball coaches
 Yuri Sapega

Belarusian weightlifters
 Hanna Batsiushka
 Andrei Rybakou
 Tatsiana Stukalava
 Leonid Taranenko

Sports venues in Belarus

Transport in Belarus
 Transport in Belarus
 Dnieper-Bug Canal
 Marshrutka
 State Committee of Aviation

Airlines of Belarus
 Belavia
 Template:Airlines of Belarus

Airports in Belarus
 Gomel Airport
 Minsk International Airport
 Minsk-1

Rail transport in Belarus
 Rail transport in Belarus
 Children's Railroad (Minsk)

Minsk Metro
 Minsk Metro
 Avtozavodskaya Line
 Borisovskiy Trakt
 Maskoŭskaja line
 Uruchie
 Vostok (Minsk Metro)

Railway stations in Belarus
 Minsk Terminal

Roads in Belarus
 European route E28
 European route E30

Belarus stubs

 1996 Belarus Referendum
 Academy of Public Administration under the aegis of the President of the Republic of Belarus
 Agriculture in Belarus
 Aleksandra and Konstantin
 Basovišča
 Batory Square
 BelAZ
 Belarus Ice Hockey Federation
 Belarus at the 1994 Winter Olympics
 Belarus at the 1996 Summer Olympics
 Belarus at the 1998 Winter Olympics
 Belarus at the 2006 Winter Paralympics
 Belarusfilm
 Belarusian Association of Journalists
 Belarusian Autocephalous Orthodox Church
 Belarusian Hockey League
 Belarusian State University
 Belarusian heraldry
 Belarusian resistance movement
 Belarusian rock
 Belarusian-American relations
 Boys and Girls (Angelica Agurbash song)
 Children's Railroad (Minsk)
 Committee for Standardization, Metrology and Certification of Belarus
 Communications in Belarus
 Dinamo Stadium (Minsk)
 Drazdy conflict
 Dreamlin
 Drobna drabnitsa (song)
 Electrokids
 Dinamo Minsk
 Belshina Bobruisk
 FC Darida Minsk Raion
 FC Dinamo Brest
 FC Dnepr Mogilev
 FC Gomel
 FC SKVICH Minsk
 FC Vitebsk
 FC Partizan Minsk
 FC Molodechno
 FC Naftan Novopolotsk
 FC Shakhtyor Soligorsk
 FC Slavia Mozyr
 FC Torpedo Zhodino
 FC Traktor Minsk
 FC Transmash Mogilev
 FC Zvezda-BGU Minsk
 Football Federation of Belarus
 Gomelavia
 Hinduism in Belarus
 House of Representatives of the Republic of Belarus
 State Security Agency of the Republic of Belarus
 KRIWI
 Khorovod
 Kirov Bridge
 Krama (band)
 List of museums in Belarus
 List of national parks of Belarus
 Meleshkovichi
 Ministry of Internal Affairs of Belarus
 Minsk Automobile Plant
 Minsk Terminal
 Minsk Tractor Works
 Miss Belarus
 Mum (Eurovision song)
 My Galileo
 National Assembly of the Republic of Belarus
 Our Lady of the Gate of Dawn
 Parason
 Presidential Guard (Belarus)
 Radio Stil (Belarus)
 Randomajestiq
 Republican Institute for Vocational Education
 Russian Colonialism
 SKA Minsk
 Shlomo Heiman
 Stadion Darida
 Supreme Court of Belarus
 Template:Belarus-stub
 The Wall (short stories)
 TransAVIAexport Airlines
 Ufocom
 Union of Poles in Belarus
 Volozhin yeshiva
 Zdrawneva

See also
Lists of country-related topics - similar lists for other countries

Notes